Além da Ilusão (English title: A Trick of Fate) is a Brazilian telenovela produced and broadcast by TV Globo. It is written by Alessandra Poggi, with the collaboration of Adriana Chevalier, Letícia Mey, Flávio Marinho, Rita Lemgruber. It aired from 7 February 2022 to 19 August 2022. It stars Larissa Manoela, Rafael Vitti, Danilo Mesquita, Antônio Calloni, Malu Galli, Marcello Novaes, Bárbara Paz, and Paloma Duarte.

The telenovela is divided into two phases, the first set in Poços de Caldas, Minas Gerais in 1934 and the second in Campos dos Goytacazes, Rio de Janeiro in 1944. It follows the wealthy sisters Elisa and Isadora who, each in a different phase, fall in love with the magician Davi. The sisters are both played by Larissa Manoela.

Plot 
In Poços de Caldas in 1934, Elisa, the naïve daughter of the wealthy couple Matias and Violeta, falls in love with Davi, a young magician. Matias does not approve of their relationship, and Elisa ends up dying when her father tries to kill Davi but the bullet hits her instead. Davi is framed for this crime and sentenced to a 20-year prison term.

In 1944, ten years afterwards, the family lives in Campos dos Goytacazes. Matias has become psychologically unstable and cannot remember the past, while Violeta co-owns the weaving factory Tecelagem Tropical with the widowed Eugênio, with whom she starts to live a forbidden romance envied by the ambitious Úrsula, who has always been rejected by Eugênio and is capable of anything to get rid of Violeta. Matias and Violeta's younger daughter Isadora, who is now eighteen and physically similar to Elisa, dates Úrsula's arrogant son Joaquim, who is manipulated by his mother into marrying Isadora in order to inherit the family's fortune.

Meanwhile, Davi manages to escape prison and boards the luggage wagon of a train. After the train derails and crashes, he manages to steal the documents of Rafael, an almost fatal victim of the accident who gets into a coma. He then goes to the family's farm in Campos dos Goytacazes, where he begins to impersonate Rafael in order to conceal his real identity and eventually prove his innocence. The only person in the house who knows the truth about Davi is the maid Augusta, who believes in his innocence and often helps and advises him.

Davi's plans are hindered when he and Isadora fall in love with each other, leaving him to confront not only Joaquim, Úrsula and Matias, but also the dilemma of telling Isadora who he really is or not.

Besides the main storyline, Além da Ilusão also shows secondary situations involving other characters, such as other members of the family and factory workers living in the village around the house.

Cast 
 Larissa Manoela as Elisa and Isadora Camargo Tapajós
 Sofia Budke as Child Isadora
 Rafael Vitti as Davi
 Malu Galli as Violeta Camargo Tapajós
 Marcello Novaes as Eugênio Barbosa
 Paloma Duarte as Heloísa Camargo
 Ana Clara Winter as Young Heloísa
 Bárbara Paz as Úrsula Alves
 Danilo Mesquita as Joaquim Alves
 Thiago Voltolini as Young Joaquim
 Eriberto Leão as Leônidas
 Olívia Araujo as Augusta dos Santos
 Alexandra Richter as Júlia "Julinha" Figueiredo Andrade
 Jayme Matarazzo as Father Tenório
 Marcos Veras as Enrico
 Cláudio Jaborandy as Benê
 Carla Cristina Cardoso as Felicidade
 Guilherme Silva as Onofre
 Patricia Pinho as Fátima
 Roberta Gualda as Giovanna Martinelli
 Cláudio Gabriel as Cipriano
 Caroline Dallarosa as Arminda Figueiredo Andrade
 Larissa Nunes as Letícia
 Maria Luiza Galhano as Young Letícia
 Débora Ozório as Olívia
 Letícia Pedro as Young Olívia
 Guilherme Prates as Lorenzo
 Vinícius Pieri as Young Lorenzo
 Andrea Dantas as Romana
 Mariah da Penha as Manuela dos Santos
 Marcello Scorel
 Luciano Quirino as Abílio
 Ricky Tavares as Inácio
 Jorge Lucas as Delegate Salvador
 Carol Romano as Mariana
 Patrick Sampaio as Artur
 Alex Brasil as Dr. Elias
 Thayla Luz
 Fabrício Belsoff as Rafael Antunes
 Luciana de Rezende as Iara
 Leandra Lopez as Lavínia
 Giulia Ayumi
 Gaby Amarantos as Emília
 Duda Brack as Iolanda Gauthier
 Matheus Dias as Bento
 Pedro Guilherme Rodrigues as Child Bento
 Lima Duarte as Afonso Camargo
 Paulo Betti as Constantino Figueiredo
 Marisa Orth as Margot
 Antônio Calloni as Matias Tapajós
 Arlete Salles as Santa Figueiredo Andrade
 Emiliano Queiroz as Father Romeu
 Nicolas Parente as Jojo

Production 
Alessandra Poggi began developing the telenovela in 2018. The telenovela had the working titles O Reverso da Fortuna (The Reverse of Fortune) and O Preço da Ilusão (The Price of Illusion), and in late 2019 it was confirmed as an upcoming production for the 6pm timeslot. Filming began in September 2021 in Poços de Caldas, Minas Gerais. In November 2021, interior filming began at Estúdios Globo.

Ratings

References

External links 
 

2022 telenovelas
2022 Brazilian television series debuts
2022 Brazilian television series endings
2020s Brazilian television series
TV Globo telenovelas
Brazilian telenovelas
Portuguese-language telenovelas
Child abduction in television